Nicolas Josef Eugene Holl (10 December 1855 in Provins – c. 1919) was a French entomologist who specialised in Lepidoptera.

Nicolas Holl was a military engineer. Holl collected extensively in Algiers and Blida. His collections were sold to Walter Rothschild. He was a Member of the Société entomologique de France.

Works
partial list
Holl, 1909 Sur deux variétés de coloration du Thestor Ballus F. [Lep. Lycaenidae] Bull. Soc. ent. Fr. 1909 : 228-229
Holl, 1910 Description d'une variété nouvelle de Thais rumina L. [Lep. Papilionidae] Bull. Soc. ent. Fr. 1910 : 164

References
Oberthür, C. 1916 Lepidopterists Études de lépidoptérologie comparée, impr. Oberthür 11
Rothschild, W. 1925 Critical List of the collection of Algerian Lepidoptera of the late Captain N. J. E. Holl. Novitates Zoologicae. 32 : 195-229 online

French lepidopterists
1855 births
1919 deaths